SponsorChange was a United States-based peer-to-peer philanthropy organization that provides a way for people to donate directly to skill-based service projects, which are completed by college graduates in exchange for student loan pay.

Overview
The organization was started in 2009 by Raymar Hampshire, then a Coro Fellow in Public Affairs. The organization collected skill-based service projects and helps recruit change agents to use their skills to complete them. 

Donors could select projects and contribute as much as they want, helping both non-profits and college graduates reach their full potential.

References

External links
Donateers Website

Donation